Canebrake is an unincorporated community in Kern County, California.

Canebrake Creek, which State Route 178 follows down to Canebrake from the Walker Pass, was named by Robert S. Williamson in the fall of 1853 after he observed Indians there collecting the sugary reeds from a canebrake, or bulrush patch. The creek is a major tributary of the South Fork Kern River, which it flows into at Bloomfield Ranch, part of the Canebrake Ecological Reserve.

The original town site was located about three miles further east on Isabella-Walker Pass Road.  The area was the site of a speakeasy and alcohol still during prohibition, run by a local bootlegger named Victor Hugo. The Chimney Peak Back Country Byway splits off from Route 178 in Canebrake, leading to the Chimney Peak Wilderness and connecting to some of the most rugged and remote areas of the Southern Sierra Nevada.

References

External links

Unincorporated communities in Kern County, California
Unincorporated communities in California